This is a list of basketball players from Canada who have played in the National Basketball Association (NBA).

Active players
Nickeil Alexander-Walker
New Orleans Pelicans (2019–2022)
Utah Jazz (2022–2023)
Minnesota Timberwolves (2023–present)
Dalano Banton
Toronto Raptors (2021–present)
RJ Barrett
New York Knicks (2019–present)
Khem Birch
Orlando Magic (2017–2021)
Toronto Raptors (2021–2023)
San Antonio Spurs (2023–present)
Chris Boucher
Golden State Warriors (2017–2018)
Toronto Raptors (2018–present)
Oshae Brissett
Toronto Raptors (2019–2020)
Indiana Pacers (2021–present)
Dillon Brooks
Memphis Grizzlies (2017–present)
Brandon Clarke
Memphis Grizzlies (2019–present)
Luguentz Dort
Oklahoma City Thunder (2019–present)
Shai Gilgeous-Alexander
Los Angeles Clippers (2018–2019)
Oklahoma City Thunder (2019–present)
Caleb Houstan
Orlando Magic (2022-present)
Cory Joseph
San Antonio Spurs (2011–2015)
Toronto Raptors (2015–2017)
Indiana Pacers (2017–2019)
Sacramento Kings (2019–2021)
Detroit Pistons (2021–present)
Mfiondu Kabengele
Los Angeles Clippers (2019–2020)
Cleveland Cavaliers (2021)
Boston Celtics (2022–present)
A.J. Lawson
Minnesota Timberwolves (2022)
Dallas Mavericks (2022-present)
Trey Lyles
Utah Jazz (2015–2017)
Denver Nuggets (2017–2019)
San Antonio Spurs (2019–2021)
Detroit Pistons (2021–2022)
Sacramento Kings (2021–present)
Bennedict Mathurin
Indiana Pacers (2022-present)
Jamal Murray
Denver Nuggets (2016–present)
Andrew Nembhard
Indiana Pacers (2022-present)
Kelly Olynyk
Boston Celtics (2013–2017)
Miami Heat (2017–2021)
Houston Rockets (2021)
Detroit Pistons (2021–2022)
Utah Jazz (2022-present)
Eugene Omoruyi
Dallas Mavericks (2021)
Oklahoma City Thunder (2022-2023)
Detroit Pistons (2023-present)
Dwight Powell
Boston Celtics (2014)
Dallas Mavericks (2014–present)
Shaedon Sharpe
Portland Trail Blazers (2022-present)
Andrew Wiggins
Minnesota Timberwolves (2014–2020)
Golden State Warriors (2020–present)

Awards and honors
Hall of Famers

Bob Houbregs, 1987
Steve Nash, 2018

Most Valuable Player

Steve Nash, 2 times, 2005–2006

All-NBA Team

Steve Nash, First Team 3 times (2005–2007), Second Team 2 times (2008, 2010), Third Team 2 times (2002–2003)

First overall draft pick

Anthony Bennett (Cleveland Cavaliers, UNLV, 2013)
Andrew Wiggins (Cleveland Cavaliers, Kansas, 2014)

Rookie of the Year Award

Andrew Wiggins (Minnesota Timberwolves, 2015)

Defensive Player of the Year

None

Most Improved Player

None

Sixth Man of the Year

None

All-Rookie Team

Rick Fox, Second Team, 1992
Tristan Thompson, Second Team, 2012
Kelly Olynyk, Second Team, 2014
Andrew Wiggins, First Team, 2015
Jamal Murray, Second Team, 2017
Shai Gilgeous-Alexander, Second Team, 2019
Brandon Clarke, First Team, 2020

NBA Champions

Mike Smrek, 2 times, 1987–1988
Bill Wennington, 3 times, 1996–1998
Rick Fox, 3 times, 2000–2002
Joel Anthony, 2 times, 2012–2013
Cory Joseph, 1 time, 2014
Tristan Thompson, 1 time, 2016
Chris Boucher, 2 times, 2018–2019
Andrew Wiggins, 1 time, 2022

NBA Finals MVP

None

NBA Citizenship Award
 Steve Nash, 2007
 Samuel Dalembert, 2010

NBA Sportsmanship Award

None

Teammate of the Year

None

All-Star selection
Steve Nash, 8 times, 2002–2003, 2005–2008, 2010, 2012
Shai Gilgeous-Alexander, 2023
Andrew Wiggins, 2022
Jamaal Magloire, 2004

Players
This is an alphabetical list of 62 basketball players from Canada who have played in the National Basketball Association since 1946. Players name listed in BOLD are currently active players.


A
Kyle Alexander
Nickeil Alexander-Walker
 Joel Anthony

B
Norm Baker
Dalano Banton
RJ Barrett
Anthony Bennett
Sim Bhullar
Hank Biasatti
Khem Birch
Chris Boucher
Ignas Brazdeikis
Oshae Brissett
Dillon Brooks

C

Brandon Clarke
Ron Crevier

D
Samuel Dalembert
 Nate Darling
Luguentz Dort

E
Tyler Ennis

F
Rick Fox

G
Shai Gilgeous-Alexander
Stewart Granger

H
Lars Hansen
Bob Houbregs
Caleb Houstan

J
Cory Joseph
Kris Joseph

K
Mfiondu Kabengele

L
A. J. Lawson
Trey Lyles

M
Todd MacCulloch
Jamaal Magloire
Karim Mané
Bennedict Mathurin
Naz Mitrou-Long
Mychal Mulder
Jamal Murray

N
Steve Nash
Andrew Nicholson
Andrew Nembhard

O
Kelly Olynyk
Eugene Omoruyi

P
Kevin Pangos
Dwight Powell
Joshua Primo

R
Xavier Rathan-Mayes
Andy Rautins
Leo Rautins

S
Robert Sacre
Marial Shayok
Mike Smrek
Gino Sovran
Nik Stauskas
Shaedon Sharpe

T
Tristan Thompson

V
Ernie Vandeweghe

W
Bill Wennington
Andrew Wiggins
Lindell Wigginton
Kyle Wiltjer

Z
Jim Zoet

See also
 List of foreign NBA players
 List of Canadians in NASCAR
 List of Canadians in the National Football League
 List of Major League Baseball players from Canada

References

NBA
   
Canadian Nba